Pony Creek may refer to:

Pony Creek (Indiana), a stream in Indiana
Pony Creek (North Fork North Fabius River), a stream in Missouri
Pony Creek Park, a park in Iowa